Sərək is a village and municipality in the Astara Rayon of Azerbaijan.  It has a population of 1,603.

Notable natives 

 Aghahasan Nakhmetov — Full Cavalier of the Order of Glory.
 Yalchin Nasirov — National Hero of Azerbaijan.

References 

Populated places in Astara District

Tağı Şirinov
Ramazan Şirinov